This is a list of people from Ashford in South East England. It may include people from the town of Ashford and the wider Borough of Ashford, in Kent.

 Alexander Arnold (born 1992), actor, plays character Richard Hardbeck on Skins; born in Ashford
 Bob Astles (1924–2012), former associate of Ugandan presidents Milton Obote and Idi Amin; born in Ashford
 Alfred Austin (1835–1913), poet, appointed Poet Laureate in 1896; died in Ashford
 Alex Brooker (born 1984), comedian, journalist and co-host of The Last Leg; lived in Ashford. 
 Ben Brown (born 1960), journalist and news presenter; born in Ashford
 Craig Buckham (born 1983), cricketer
 Patsy Byrne (born 1933), actress, known for playing Nursie in the BBC sitcom Blackadder II; born in Ashford
 Roger Dean (born 1944), artist featured on the album covers of the band Yes; born in Ashford
 Lisa Dobriskey (born 1983), won the Commonwealth Gold 1500m athletics event in 2006; born in Ashford
 Josh Doyle (born 1981), guitarist, singer and founder of hitmakers the Dumdums; currently a solo artist working out of Nashville Tennessee; born in the area
 Sir John Fogge (c.1417–1490) He built and endowed the church at Ashford, Kent as well as the College at Ashford. He was buried in the church, where he is also commemorated in a memorial window
 Frederick Forsyth (born 1938), author and occasional political commentator, known for thrillers such as The Day of the Jackal, The Dogs of War, The Odessa File, Icon and The Fist of God; born in Ashford
 Barry Fuller (born 1984), professional football player; born in Ashford
 John Fuller (born 1937), poet and author; Fellow Emeritus at Magdalen College, Oxford; born in Ashford
 Stephen Hills (1771–1844), architect, designed the original Pennsylvania State Capitol in Harrisburg; born in Ashford
 Bob Holness, (1928–2012), television presenter; born in Ashford, attended Norton Knatchbull Grammar School
 Richard Huckle (1986–2019), convicted sex offender; dubbed "Britain's worst paedophile"; born in Ashford
 Sir Sydney Nicholson (1875–1947), choir director, organist and composer; founder of the Royal School of Church Music; died in Ashford
 Dudley Pope (1925–1997), writer; born in Ashford
William Pomfret (1823-1902), Conservative politician, magistrate and MP for Ashford
 Vic Reeves (born 1959), comedian, actor, television presenter; lives in the area
 Neil Ruddock (born 1968) professional footballer played for Tottenham Hotspur, Southampton, Liverpool and other clubs; born in Ashford, attended Norton Knatchbull Grammar School
 Mark Rylance (born 1960), actor and theatre director; born in Ashford
 Sir Malcolm Sargent (1895–1967), conductor, organist and composer; born in Ashford
 Gerald Sithole (born 2002), professional footballer played for Gillingham and Bolton Wanderers, born in Ashford. 
 Jamie Staff (born 1973), BMX cycling world champion; track cycling Commonwealth Games and world championship gold medalist; born in Ashford
 Oli Sykes (born 1986), vocalist for alternative metal band Bring Me the Horizon; born in Ashford
 Eric Thiman (1900–1975), English composer
 James Tredwell (born 1982), Kent and England One Day International cricketer; born in the area
 Tom Varndell (born 1985), professional rugby union player; born in Ashford
 Dr John Wallis, (1616–1703), internationally recognised as one of the greatest mathematicians, credited by Sir Isaac Newton as being the founder of his theory of gravity; born in Ashford
 Simone Weil (1909–1943), French philosopher and mystic, died in Grosvenor Sanatorium and is buried in the town's Bybrook Cemetery
 John Wells (1936–1998), actor, writer and satirist; began his television career as a writer on That Was The Week That Was; born in Ashford

Notes and references

People from Ashford, Kent
Lists of English people by location
People from Ashford